Aurora Bautista Zúmel (15 October 1925 – 27 August 2012) was a Spanish film actress.

Bautista was born in Valladolid, and died in Madrid, aged 86.

Selected filmography
1948 Madness for Love, by Juan de Orduña
1950 Pequeñeces, by Juan de Orduña
1950 Agustina of Aragon, by Juan de Orduña
1953 Condenados, by Manuel Mur Oti
1956 The Cat
1959 El marido, by Nanni Loy and Gianni Puccini
1959 Sonatas, by Juan Antonio Bardem
1963 La Tía Tula, by Miguel Picazo
 1968: Uno a uno, sin piedad, by Rafael R. Marchent
1969 Pepa Doncel, by Luis Lucia
1969 Gangster's Law, by Siro Marcellini
1973 A Candle for the Devil, by Eugenio Martín
1985 Extramuros, by Miguel Picazo
1987 Divinas palabras, by José Luis García Sánchez
1988 Amanece, que no es poco, by José Luis Cuerda
1999 Adiós con el corazón, by José Luis García Sánchez

References

External links

1925 births
2012 deaths
Spanish film actresses
People from Valladolid
Actresses from Castile and León